Morris Beckman is the name of:

Morris Beckman (architect), American architect
Morris Beckman (writer) (1921–2015), English writer